Tetrakis was a Greek town of ancient Paphlagonia on the Black Sea coast. Its site is unlocated but based on the position it occupies in the text of the Periplus of Pseudo-Scylax, it would be west of Sinope.

Its site is unlocated.

References

Populated places in ancient Paphlagonia
Former populated places in Turkey
Lost ancient cities and towns